Patricia "Bonnie" Hickey (born 5 March 1955) is a Canadian former politician. Hickey was a member of the House of Commons of Canada from 1993 to 1997.

Born in St. John's, Newfoundland and Labrador, Hickey was elected in the 1993 federal election at the St. John's East electoral district for the Liberal party. Bonnie Hickey served in the 35th Canadian Parliament after which she was defeated by Progressive Conservative candidate Norman Doyle in the 1997 federal election.

In 1998, she lost to Stephen LeDrew in her bid to become president of the Liberal Party. In the following year, she was employed by the province's tourism ministry as part of the staff handling the Viking anniversary and Year 2000 special events.

Hickey unsuccessfully ran for the provincial Liberal nomination in Signal Hill-Quidi Vidi for the 2015 election.

References

External links

1955 births
Living people
Liberal Party of Canada MPs
Politicians from St. John's, Newfoundland and Labrador
Women members of the House of Commons of Canada
Women in Newfoundland and Labrador politics